Cetea may refer to several places in Romania:

 Cetea, a village in Galda de Jos Commune, Alba County
 Cetea, a village in Borod Commune, Bihor County
 Cetea (Criș), a tributary of the Borod in Bihor County
 Cetea (Galda), a tributary of the Galda in Alba County

See also
Cetus (mythology) (pl. Cetea)